{{Infobox settlement
 | official_name = Vitória da Conquista
 | nickname =
 | motto = 
 | website = Prefeitura de Vitória da Conquista
 | image_skyline = VDC parcial.jpg
 | image_flag = Bandeira Vitoria da Conquista.svg
 | image_seal = Brasão Vitoria da Conquista.svg
 | image_map = Bahia Municip VitoriadaConquista.svg
 | map_caption = Location in Bahia, Brazil
 | subdivision_type = Country
 | subdivision_type1 = Region
 | subdivision_type2 = State
 | subdivision_name = Brazil
 | subdivision_name1 = Northeast 
 | subdivision_name2 = Bahia
 | leader_title = Mayor
 | leader_name = Sheila Lemos (DEM)
 | established_title = Founded 
 | established_date = November 9, 1840
 | established_title2 =
 | established_date2 =
 | established_title3 =
 | establis'Texto em negritohed_date3 =
 | area_footnotes  =
 | area_magnitude = 
 |area_code              = 77 
| area_total_km2 = 3204.257
 | area_total_sq_mi = 
 | area_land_km2 = 
 | area_land_sq_mi = 
 | area_water_km2 = 
 | area_water_sq_mi = 
 | pushpin_map = Brazil
 | population_footnotes =
 | population_as_of = 2020
 | population_total = 341,128
 | population_metro = 
 | population_density_km2 = auto
 | timezone = BRT
 | utc_offset = −3
 | timezone_DST = UTC-2
 | utc_offset_DST = -2
 | coordinates      = 
 | elevation_footnotes  = 
 | elevation_m = 923
 | footnotes = 
}}Vitória da Conquista''' is a municipality in Bahia, Brazil, that has a population of approximately 341,000 people as of 2020, according to the IBGE (Brazilian Institute of Geography and Statistics). It is the third largest city in the state of Bahia, after Salvador and Feira de Santana respectively.

Vitória da Conquista is known as simply "Conquista" by locals in order to differentiate it from the city of Vitória in the state of Espírito Santo. It was named after the colony of Vitória da Conquista.

History
Vitória da Conquista was founded in 1783, after several battles against the native Imboré and Mongoió tribes by João Gonçalves da Costa, born in Chaves, Trás-os-Montes, Portugal.

Costa had served the Portuguese crown during Joseph I's kingdom, fighting the natives, conquering their land, and attempting to convert them to Christianity. He founded the Arraial da Conquista ("Conquest Town") near the site of the last battles and began the building of a church in honour of the Holy Mother of Victory.

At the same time, João Gonçalves da Costa was ordered to lead the construction of two of the principal roads in the state of Bahia, one from Vitória da Conquista to the city of Ilhéus on the coast and another from Vitória da Conquista to the Jequitinhonha River in Minas Gerais. Today, the latter road has become part of the larger federal highway system, and is known as the Rio-Bahia — BR-116.

In 2019, Vitória da Conquista was named the 10th most violent city in the world by the Citizens' Council for Public Security and Criminal Justice in Mexico.

Geography
Climate
The city has a subtropical highland climate (Cwb/Cwa, according to the Köppen climate classification), relatively dry and moderated in temperature by the elevation. It closely borders a tropical savanna climate (Aw). The altitude of the city itself varies between 857 meters (2811 feet) and 950 meters (3116 feet). Precipitation from April to August is often characterized by fine, misty rain, while heavier rains fall from October to March. Winters (July through October) tend to lack much precipitation but are cool and humid, with cold air coming up to the plateau from the ocean and often producing fog.

Mean temperature varies from a low of 17.8 °C (64 °F) in July to 21.8 °C (71 °F) in March. Mean rainfall ranges from 17.9 mm (.7 inches) in July to 127.8 mm (5 inches) in December. (1961-1990 trends from Hong Kong Observatories).

The vegetation ranges from very dry and coarse (1,000 meters and above) to an array of grasses, ferns and palms at slightly lower elevations on the plateau. This is the coffee-growing elevation (MEDEIROS, Ruy H. A., Notas Críticas ao livro "O Município da Vitória" de Tranquilino Torres, p. 87).

Economy
The major economic activities are commerce, medical services, and coffee growing. The city is home to the main campus of Southwest Bahia State University.

The business atmosphere is energetic and in full blown expansion mode. From larger businesses such as Grupo Marinho de Andrade (Teiú and Revani), Coca-Cola, Dilly Calçados (shoes), Umbro, BahiaFarma and Café Maratá, to the smallest cottage industries, the area continues to attract strong interest. The best place for holding events in the city is the Miraflores Arena.

The entrepreneurial Ymborés Industrial Park (Centro Industrial dos Ymborés) lies on the outskirts of the city along with industries such as ceramics, granite/marble, shoes, toilet valves, cleaning products, bedding, and many others. Micro industries produce safes, candles, clothing, packaging, and hundreds of other products for local consumption and export.

As a business center, Vitoria da Conquista serves the entire southwestern region of the state of Bahia and the northern part of the state of Minas Gerais.

Transport
Vitória da Conquista is served by Glauber Rocha Airport. There is a bus terminal with lines that go to all cities in the state and major cities in the country.

 Sports 
The city is home of the Série D football club Esporte Clube Vitória da Conquista, and former Série B Serrano Sport Club.

Historic structures
Vitória da Conquista is home to numerous historic structures. Only the House of Dona Zaza (Casa de Dona Zaza'') is protected as a state monument.

Crime
Vitória da Conquista has the highest murder rate in Brazil at 60.01 per 100,000 population, and has the 10th highest murder rate for cities in the world.

Notable people
 Antônio Rodrigo Nogueira aka "Minotauro" — mixed martial artist
 Glauber Rocha — film director, actor and screenwriter

References
 

 

Municipalities in Bahia